Alexander Island is one of the Queen Elizabeth Islands of the Canadian arctic islands located in Nunavut, Canada. It lies south of Massey Island and Île Marc (across Boyer Strait), and north of Bathurst Island (across Pell Inlet). Alexander Island is uninhabited.

References

External links
 Alexander Island in the Atlas of Canada - Toporama; Natural Resources Canada

Islands of the Queen Elizabeth Islands
Uninhabited islands of Qikiqtaaluk Region